Jonathan Schanzer is an American author and senior vice president of research at the Foundation for Defense of Democracies. He oversees the work of the organization's experts and scholars.

Professional overview
Schanzer was a Research Fellow at the Washington Institute for Near East Policy. In 2011, Schanzer became a senior vice president of research at the Foundation for Defense of Democracies.

From 2004 to 2007 Schanzer worked for the Office of Intelligence and Analysis at the U.S. Department of the Treasury.

Publications
 Hamas vs. Fatah: The Struggle for Palestine, Palgrave Macmillan (November 11, 2008) .
 Al-Qaeda's Armies: Middle East Affiliate Groups & The Next Generation of Terror, Washington Institute for Near East Policy (October 1, 2004) .
 Gaza Conflict 2021: Hamas, Israel and Eleven Days of War, Foundation for Defense of Democracies Press (November 10, 2021) .

References

Citations

Sources

External links
 Jonathan Schanzer's Web site
 

Middle Eastern studies in the United States
American male journalists
Islam and politics
Living people
1972 births